The 2009 Camp Capsat mutiny refers to the mutiny of a part of the Malagasy army which led to the ousting of Madagascar president Marc Ravalomanana on March 17, 2009, and to the nomination of Andry Rajoelina as President of the High Transitional Authority on March 21, 2009. The 2009 Camp Capsat mutiny began near the Malagasy capital of Antananarivo on March 8, 2009.

First day
In the early morning of March 8, 2009 Camp Capsat near the capital of Antananarivo mutinied and stated that they did not support the government's actions in a growing violent dispute between President Marc Ravalomanana and the former mayor of Antananarivo, Andry Rajoelina. The feud has resulted in violent street protests across the country since the beginning of February resulting in at least 28 deaths to up to 135 people killed in resulting looting after the first riots. Camp Capsat soldiers, numbering 600 broke out of the military base and have seized a main road leading to the capital setting up a roadblock after reports came in that the Presidential Guard was preparing to attack the camp.

The mutiny has occurred by military members who have refused to follow high ups in the military as clashes between opposition supporters and military forces in Madagascar have killed four people since Wednesday.

Second Day 

"An AFP reporter was able to access one wing of the military compound, where soldiers who refused to be quoted confirmed that the base was rebelling in protest at the regime’s repression of opposition demonstrations. The army chief of staff came this morning in an attempt to sweet-talk us but he quickly had to get back in his car and leave, said one of them."

The government military minister has warned mutinous soldiers that they will face action and he stated that he hopes the army "doesn't fracture" as the situation is a political problem, not a military problem and it does not need the involvement "of the army." Western analysts predict that the situation in Madagascar will only be solved when the military decides to join the opposition or remain loyal to the president.

Third Day 

Mutinous soldiers at Camp Capsat still maintain their roadblock and control Camp Capsat outside of the capital and no action has been taken by the Presidential Guard. There are no reports that other military units have joined the mutiny.

Fourth Day 

Military general General Edmond Rasolofomahandry, leader of the Madagascar military was sacked by the President of Madagascar after threatening to take control of the country in 72 hours if the President and Opposition did not come to a peaceful conclusion. His threat resulted in the defence minister a key Presidential ally resigning. The President then appointed Andre Andriarijaona as the new military general of the Madagascar military.

With the resignation of the army chief and the Defense Minister and the installation of pro-mutiny army chief and Defence Minister may lead to a military junta or a coup against President Marc Ravalomanana. Most people in Madagascar believe Marc Ravalomanana will be replaced.

References

Mutinies
2009 in Madagascar
Battles and conflicts without fatalities